HMS P556 (pennant number P556), was a S1-class submarine of the British Royal Navy.

USS S-29 was transferred to the Royal Navy at New London on 5 June 1942. She arrived at Gibraltar, via Bermuda, in August 1942 to refit, nominally as part of the 8th Flotilla. She moved to Plymouth in February 1943, for an anti-submarine training role. In November 1943, she moved to Portsmouth for service in the same role. Due to the number of mechanical failures it suffered, it acquired the nickname "Reluctant Dragon".

HMS P556 was damaged by a battery explosion on 27 January 1944, and was decommissioned into the reserve in April. She was returned to the United States Navy on 26 January 1945.

She was sold for scrap to Messrs Pounds, Portsmouth on 24 January 1947. There she became one of Pounds' submarine 'fleet' and was not broken up until 1988. The sail was kept and is now outside Fort Southwick.

References

External links
 

 

United States S-class submarines of the Royal Navy
Ships built in Quincy, Massachusetts
1922 ships
World War II submarines of the United Kingdom